Vishal Arjune (born 24 October 1981) is a former Guyanese cricketer who represented West Indies B in West Indian domestic cricket. He played as a right-handed middle-order batsman and occasional off-spin bowler.

Arjune was born in Unity Village, in Guyana's Demerara-Mahaica region. His older brother, Krishna Arjune, also played cricket at a high level. In 2001, Arjune was selected to tour England with the West Indies under-19 team. He played in Test and ODI series against the England under-19s, and in the second Test scored 79 against an attack that included future England internationals James Anderson and James Tredwell. Arjune made his first-class debut the following year, playing two matches for West Indies B (an under-23 development team) in the 2001–02 Busta Cup. He had little success, making 22 runs from three innings, and never played at first-class level again. His brother played alongside him in both of his first-class appearances.

References

External links
Player profile and statistics at CricketArchive
Player profile and statistics at ESPNcricinfo

1981 births
Living people
Guyanese cricketers
Indo-Guyanese people
People from Demerara-Mahaica
West Indies B cricketers